Johann Böhm (20 January 1895 – 27 November 1952) was a German Bohemian chemist who focused on photochemistry and radiography. The aluminum-containing mineral boehmite (or böhmite) was named after him.

Böhm studied at the German Polytechnic University in Prague and then worked with Fritz Haber in Berlin where he re-designed and considerably improved  the Weissenberg  x-ray goniometer.  In 1926 George de Hevesy, then a professor at the University of Freiburg, invited Böhm to co-operate with him on a series of experiments in spectrographic analysis.  Afterwards Böhm worked at Freiburg University as an assistant and later as an associate professor.    From  October 1935  he was a professor of physical chemistry at the German University in Prague. After the war Böhm was allowed to remain in the country and become again a citizen of Czechoslovakia because he had been active in the anti-Nazi movement supporting Czech scientists such as Jaroslav Heyrovský, but was not permitted to continue his academic career. He worked in an industrial research institute in Rybitví (Výzkumný ústav organických syntéz). A few days  before his death he was appointed Corresponding Member of the Czechoslovak Academy of Sciences.

He died in Prague on 27 November 1952.

References

External links 
 Contains short biography of Böhm (in Czech)

1895 births
1952 deaths
Scientists from České Budějovice
People from the Kingdom of Bohemia
German Bohemian people
Czechoslovak chemists
20th-century German chemists
Czech Technical University in Prague alumni